Clarinet Factory is a Czech clarinet quartet formed in Prague in 1994. The group plays classical music, jazz, crossover, ethnic, minimalist, electronic, and soundtrack music. The quartet is composed of Jindřich Pavliš, Luděk Boura, Vojtěch Nýdl, and Petr "Pepino" Valášek.

Eternal Seekers
In 2008, Lenka Dusilová, together with Beata Hlavenková and Clarinet Factory, launched a project called Eternal Seekers. They recorded a self-titled album the same year, for which Dusilová won an Anděl Award in the Best Singer category. The track "Smiluje" was used as the opening song for the 2011 film Long Live the Family! by Robert Sedláček.

Band members
Current
 Jindřich Pavliš – clarinet
 Luděk Boura – clarinet
 Vojtěch Nýdl – clarinet
 Petr "Pepino" Valášek – bass clarinet

Past
 Jiří Sedláček

Discography
 Echoes from Stone (2003)
 Polyphony (2005)
 Eternal Seekers (2008) with Lenka Dusilová and Beata Hlavenková
 Out of Home (2010)
 Echoes of Colors (2012)
 Worx and Reworx (2014)
 Meadows (2017)
 Pipers (2020)

Awards and recognition
 Classic Prague Awards 2017 – Meadows (2017)

References

External links

 

Czech jazz ensembles
Musical groups from Prague